Sinpyeong Station is a station of Busan Metro Line 1 located in Sinpyeong-dong, Saha District, Busan, South Korea.

External links 
 Cyber station information from Busan Transportation Corporation 

Railway stations opened in 1994
Busan Metro stations
Saha District
1994 establishments in South Korea
20th-century architecture in South Korea